Christine Lakin (born January 25, 1979) is an American actress and director. She is best known for her role as Alicia "Al" Lambert on the 1990s ABC/CBS sitcom Step by Step. She also played Joan of Arc on Showtime's Reefer Madness, was the sidekick on Craig Kilborn's 2010 Fox talk show The Kilborn File, and provides the voice of Joyce Kinney in Family Guy.

Career
Lakin got her start acting in commercials, before landing her first major role as Young Rose in the American Civil War drama The Rose and the Jackal. That movie aired in 1990, one year before she was cast as Alicia Lambert, the tomboyish daughter, on Step by Step.
After Step by Step was cancelled (retired) in 1998, she continued to appear in television movies, such as Showtime's Reefer Madness and 2005's Who's Your Daddy?.
In 2006, She also appeared in a commercial called "But He Has Bud Light" that aired during Super Bowl XLI, in which her male companion wants to pick up a hitchhiker who has Bud Light beer in one hand and an axe in the other.

In 2008, she starred alongside Paris Hilton in the movie The Hottie and the Nottie, requiring extensive makeup to make her appear ugly. The film met dismal reviews in the US.
In 2010, she became Craig Kilborn's sidekick (his "Huckleberry Friend" – a reference to his "favorite movie", Breakfast at Tiffany's) on The Kilborn File on select Fox stations.Beginning in 2013, she has narrated several audiobook adaptations. She also voiced the character Jane from The Walking Dead: Season Two video game and it’s sequel The Walking Dead: A New Frontier.

She is also the voice of news anchor Joyce Kinney in the animated sitcom Family Guy, debuting in the episode "Excellence in Broadcasting". She also featured as Lois's college friend Naomi, in a live table read of "Partial Terms of Endearment"; though not in the eventual episode.

She later starred in the Pop series Hollywood Darlings with fellow 1990s child stars Jodie Sweetin and Beverley Mitchell.

Lakin also has numerous television directing credits, including 10 episodes (as of 2022) of ABC sitcom The Goldbergs, three episodes of 2019 Goldbergs spinoff sitcom Schooled, and three episodes of the 2021 Apple TV+ original series Puppy Place.

Radio and podcast appearances
Lakin appeared on Ken Reid's TV Guidance Counselor podcast on March 11, 2016.

Lakin appeared on With Special Guest Lauren Lapkus on May 12, 2017.

Lakin appeared on Drinkin' Bros Podcast on April 8, 2018.

Lakin appeared on " Pod Meets World" episode titled "Christine Lakin Meets World on October 3, 2022, discussing coming up in the entertainment industry. Hosted by Ryder Strong, Will Friedle, and Danielle Fishel.

Awards and nominations
She was nominated in 1993 for a Young Artist Award for Best Young Actress Starring in a Television Series and in 1994 for another Young Artist Award for Outstanding Youth Ensemble in a Television Series shared with Josh Byrne, Christopher Castile, Brandon Call, Staci Keanan and Angela Watson – both for Step by Step (1991). She also won a Golden Raspberry Award for Worst Screen Couple with Paris Hilton in The Hottie and the Nottie.

LA Weekly Theater Awards
 2009: Won the award for Female Comedy Performance for the Havok Theatre Company production of Dog Sees God: Confessions of a Teenage Blockhead

Ovation Awards
 2012: Nominated for Featured Actress in a Musical for the role of Julia in the Troubadour Theater Company production of Two Gentlemen of Chicago

Personal life
Lakin married actor Brandon Breault in October 2014. In November 2015, the couple announced that they were expecting their first child. Their daughter was born on March 6, 2016. She gave birth to their son on September 10, 2018.

Filmography

Film

Television

Director

Video games

Theatre

Audiobook narrations

References

External links

 

1979 births
Actresses from Georgia (U.S. state)
American child actresses
American film actresses
American musical theatre actresses
American television actresses
American voice actresses
American video game actresses
Living people
Actresses from Dallas
University of California, Los Angeles alumni
20th-century American actresses
21st-century American actresses
People from Roswell, Georgia
The Lovett School alumni